The purpose of a short-circuit test is to determine the series branch parameters of the equivalent circuit of a transformer.

Method
The test is conducted on the high-voltage (HV) side of the transformer where the low-voltage (LV) side (or the secondary) is short-circuited. A wattmeter is connected to the primary side. An ammeter is connected in series with the primary winding. A voltmeter is optional since the applied voltage is the same as the voltmeter reading. Now with the help of a variac, the applied voltage is slowly increased until the ammeter gives a reading equal to the rated current of the HV side. After reaching the rated current of the HV side, all three instruments reading (Voltmeter, Ammeter, and wattmeter readings) are recorded. The ammeter reading gives the primary equivalent of full load current IL. As the voltage applied for full load current in short circuit test on transformer is quite small compared to the rated primary voltage of the transformer, the iron losses in the transformer can be taken as negligible here.

Calculations
 is the full-load copper loss

is the applied voltage

 is the rated current

 is the resistance as viewed from the primary

is the total impedance as viewed from the primary

 is the reactance as viewed from the primary

High-power tests
A short-circuit test for determination of transformer impedance and losses is carried out with relatively low power applied to the transformer, and with winding currents of the same magnitude as in operation. A different form of short-circuit testing is done to assess the mechanical strength of the transformer windings, and their ability to withstand the high forces produced if an energized transformer experiences a short-circuit fault. Currents during such events can be several times the normal rated current. The resultant forces can distort the windings or break internal connections. For large utility-scale power transformers, high-power test laboratories have facilities to apply the very high power levels representative of a fault on an interconnected grid system.

See also
Open-circuit test
Blocked rotor test
Circle diagram

Electric transformers